Aksaray University is a public higher educational institution established on March 17, 2006, in Aksaray, Central Anatolia in Turkey. Formerly it was a subunit of the Niğde University.

The university has seven faculties, two institutes, two colleges and five vocational colleges. Its campus is located on the highway to Adana.

The university is a member of the Caucasus University Association.

Academic units
Faculties
Science and Letters
Engineering
Education
Economics and Business Administration
Veterinary
Tourism

Institutes
Sciences
Social Sciences

Colleges
Health Sciences
Health Services

Vocational colleges (VC)
Aksaray Technical Sciences VC
Aksaray Social Sciences VC
Ş.Koçhisar VC
Ortaköy VC
Health Services VC

Notable alumni
 Rıza Kayaalp, World and European champion Turkish wrestler

References

Universities and colleges in Turkey
Education in Aksaray
State universities and colleges in Turkey
Educational institutions established in 2006
2006 establishments in Turkey